The Tibor Zsíros Magyar Kupa is the annual basketball cup competition held in Hungary since 1951. Budapest Honved has won the most titles with 17. The Cup is named after the retired Hungarian player Tibor Zsíros. Each year, a knock-out tournament consisting of 8 teams is played to determine the winner of the Magyar Kupa.

Finals

Knock-out format (1951–2014)

Final Eight format (2014–present)
Since 2014, a knock-out tournament consisting of 8 teams is held each year. Teams qualify based on their position in the NB I/A season. The cup has been named after famous Hungarian basketball player, coach and referee, Tibor Zsíros.

Final top scorers and Most Valuable Players
Since 2017, a Most Valuable Player award is given to the best player on the Cup title winning team;

References

Basketball competitions in Hungary
Basketball cup competitions in Europe
1951 establishments in Hungary